Suresh Rajan (born 31 March 1963, Nagercoil) is an Indian politician from Tamil Nadu state.

Mr.Suresh Rajan has a M.A. degree. He started his political career in the Dravida Munnetra Kazhagam (DMK) youth wing. He has been elected to the Tamil Nadu Legislative Assembly for the years 1996–2001, 2006-2011 and from 2016. He was the former minister of Tourism twice in Tamil Nadu state.

Elections contested

References

1963 births
Living people
People from Kanyakumari district
Dravida Munnetra Kazhagam politicians
State cabinet ministers of Tamil Nadu
Tamil Nadu MLAs 1996–2001
Tamil Nadu MLAs 2006–2011
Tamil Nadu MLAs 2016–2021